Stakhanovskaya is a station on the Nekrasovskaya line of the Moscow Metro. The station was opened on 27 March 2020. The station is named for Stakhanovskaya Ulitsa, which, in turn, is named for Alexey Stakhanov, a coal miner who was named a Hero of Socialist Labour.

References

Moscow Metro stations
Railway stations in Russia opened in 2020
Nekrasovskaya line